Michael Dunn was a member of the Wisconsin State Assembly representing the 1st District of Milwaukee County, Wisconsin. Dunn was elected to the Assembly in 1886 and 1888. He was a Democrat. Dunn was born on March 27, 1859 in Milwaukee, Wisconsin.

References

Politicians from Milwaukee
1859 births
Year of death missing
Democratic Party members of the Wisconsin State Assembly